The 2019 CarShield 200 is a NASCAR Gander Outdoors Truck Series race held on June 22, 2019, at World Wide Technology Raceway at Gateway in Madison, Illinois. Contested over 160 laps on the  oval, it was the 11th race of the 2019 NASCAR Gander Outdoors Truck Series season.

Background

Track

Known as Gateway Motorsports Park until its renaming in April 2019, World Wide Technology Raceway is a  paved oval motor racing track in Madison, Illinois, United States. The track previously held Truck races from 1998 to 2010, and returned starting in 2014. In conjunction with the Truck Series, the ARCA Menards Series held a support race earlier in the night.

CarShield was the race's title sponsor for 2019.

Entry list
After intentionally wrecking Austin Hill under caution at the previous week's M&M's 200 at Iowa Speedway, Johnny Sauter was suspended for the Gateway race. Myatt Snider replaced him in the No. 13 ThorSport Racing truck.

Practice
Only one practice session was held as rain caused the other to be cancelled.

Final practice

Qualifying
Qualifying was cancelled due to rain. The starting lineup was determined by owner's points, awarding the pole to Christian Eckes.

Qualifying results

Race

Summary
Christian Eckes began on pole. Greg Rayl crashed into the wall in lap 3, ending his day and causing the first caution. Grant Enfinger won the Stage 1. As the stage ended, Ross Chastain and Matt Crafton battled for position, resulting in Crafton making contact with Chastain after the flag flew to end the stage.

Stage 2 was also won by Enfinger, who led the entire stage to score his third stage win of the season. He held off Myatt Snider, who was driving in place of the suspended Johnny Sauter. On lap 78, Natalie Decker crashed into the wall hard, ending her day and resulting in her fifth DNF of the year.

Harrison Burton and Sheldon Creed made contact with 15 laps remaining. Burton slid the rear end of his truck into the wall, receiving significant damage. He continued racing, though barely managing to stay on the lead lap.

The final restart took place with seven laps to go. On the restart, Chastain (who did not get tires during the lengthy caution) spun his tires, but received a helpful push from Todd Gilliland. Chastain cleared Eckes, and fended him off even though Eckes had fresher tires.

On the final lap, Eckes was passed by Gilliland and spun by Stewart Friesen. The caution was not thrown, causing Eckes to lose many positions. Chastain managed to hold off Gilliland to win the race. His truck passed inspection, redeeming himself from his stripped win in the previous week's race.

Stage Results

Stage One
Laps: 35

Stage Two
Laps: 35

Final Stage Results

Stage Three
Laps: 90

References

2019 in sports in Illinois
CarShield 200
NASCAR races at Gateway Motorsports Park